Due West is an American country music group composed of Matt Lopez, Tim Gates, and Brad Hull. Due West was founded in Nashville, Tennessee in 2004, and was almost signed to a contract with RCA Records Nashville in 2006, but lost the deal due to the merger of Sony Music and BMG. By 2009, the band self-released its debut single "I Get That All the Time," which was also made into a music video, which has aired on Great American Country. In 2011 their second single, "When the Smoke Clears," was released as a music video, Roman White was the producer.  Both "I Get That All the Time" and "When the Smoke Clears" made it into Great American Country's top 20. The trio also released a self-titled album on April 27, 2010. A second album, Forget the Miles, followed in 2011.

After parting ways with their label in 2013, they headed to popular crowd sourcing platform Kickstarter to raise funds to record and release a new album independently. They raised more than 150% of their goal (over $30,000). They entered the studio, this time with a new producer, Brandon Metcalf, who was previously a Seattle-based rock producer and new to Nashville, to create what they have said are the "best songs we've ever recorded." Together, they crafted the Move Like That EP, which is their highest-charting album to date. The title track was co-penned by hit songwriter Jimmy Robbins. The lead off single, "Slide On Over", was written by Erin Enderlin, Dylan Scott and Will Bowen.

Due West entered the studio with Metcalf again in August 2013 to record a Christmas album, released on November 26, 2013.

Discography

Studio albums

Singles

Music videos

References

Country music groups from Tennessee
American musical trios
Musical groups established in 2004
Black River Entertainment artists